
Gmina Borowa is a rural gmina (administrative district) in Mielec County, Subcarpathian Voivodeship, in south-eastern Poland.

Villages
Gmina Borowa contains the villages and settlements of Borowa, Gliny Małe, Gliny Wielkie, Górki, Łysakówek, Orłów, Pławo, Sadkowa Góra, Surowa and Wola Pławska.

Neighbouring gminas
Gmina Borowa is bordered by the gminas of Czermin, Gawłuszowice, Mielec and Połaniec.

References
Polish official population figures 2006

Borowa
Mielec County